Noel Galvin (born 6 November 1988) is an Irish Gaelic footballer who plays as a left corner-back for the Cork senior team.

Born in Ballincollig, Cork, Galvin first arrived on the inter-county scene at the age of twenty when he first linked up with the Cork under-21 team. He made his senior debut during the 2010 National Football League, however, it took a number of years before he joined Cork's championship team. Since then Galvin has become a regular member of the starting fifteen.

At club level Galvin plays both hurling and Gaelic football with Ballincollig.

Honours

Team

Cork Institute of Technology
Sigerson Cup (1): 2009

Ballincollig
Cork Under-21 Football Championship (1): 2007

Cork
All-Ireland Under-21 Football Championship (1): 2009
Munster Under-21 Football Championship (1): 2009

References

1988 births
Living people
Ballincollig Gaelic footballers
Ballincollig hurlers
Cork inter-county Gaelic footballers